Illimo is a locality in Illimo District.

Populated places in the Lambayeque Region